Áine Lawlor (born 1961) is an Irish radio and television broadcaster who has hosted many shows on RTÉ Radio 1. She has worked on various news and current affairs radio and television programmes, including News at One, The Week in Politics, Today with Pat Kenny, Today at 5, The Nature of Things, Tuesday File, Today Tonight, The Marian Finucane Show and One to One. On 7 December 2008, Lawlor presented the first Sunday morning broadcast of Morning Ireland, during which she announced news of the Irish pork crisis. She has also narrated States of Fear.

Lawlor has been described as one of Ireland's "sharpest, most experienced broadcasters".

Career
Lawlor attended Manor House School, Raheny.  She graduated from Trinity College Dublin in 1984 having spent time as President of the Students' Union.

She moved to arts administration, before going to RTÉ as a radio announcer. She went on to be a trainee journalist. In radio, she worked on Today with Pat Kenny, Today at 5 and RTÉ 2fm News. In television, she has worked on The Nature of Things, Tuesday File and Today Tonight. She was also a narrator of States of Fear, a programme on abuse in residential institutions.

Morning Ireland
For many years, Lawlor co-presented Morning Ireland, Ireland's most listened to radio programme which has been on air since 1984. She has interviewed, amongst others, ESB union boss David Naughton, US Democratic official Samantha Power, and Harald zur Hausen, Nobel Laureate and the first doctor to prove that cervical cancer was caused by a virus. It was Lawlor's voice that first informed morning radio listeners on the island of Ireland that all international Irish pork products had been recalled in December 2008. This was particularly unusual because her voice (and the Morning Ireland theme tune) was heard on the airwaves on Sunday, despite the show being scheduled to air on weekday mornings only. The Irish Independent described the occurrence as "a kind of a War of the Worlds moment", with nobody able to recall the show being broadcast on a Sunday before, and speculation mounting that the sound of the theme music must signal a major death or nuclear war. When former minister for agriculture Brendan Smith promised free cheese for the masses her interview with him made worldwide headlines.

On 14 October 2011, Lawlor announced on air at the end of Morning Ireland: "That's all from me for a while as I'm taking a break for medical treatment. Thanks to all of you who have listened over the past 16 years". The Irish Times reported that she had been diagnosed with cancer. She returned to Morning Ireland in 2012, but moved to News At One in the re-shuffle brought about by Pat Kenny's departure from the station the following year.

One to One
Lawlor also presents on an intermittent One to One, a current affairs interview programme on RTÉ One. She spent one interview with Libertas Institute leader, Declan Ganley, "looking over the top of her glasses at him, utterly determined to put a halt to his gallop, and still he kept on coming". In her interview with academic Samantha Power, Lawlor "allowed Power to drone on in that earnest and humourless way peculiar to people who think that what they have to say is of grave global import".

Personal life
Lawlor currently lives in Dublin with her husband Ian Wilson, and her four children, David, Ella and twins Megan and Jack. Her husband is also a well known producer in RTÉ 2fm. Her interests include gardening and growing and cooking her own food. She does yoga and Pilates twice a week.

Lawlor was presented with the Trinity College Alumni Award in 2008.

Lawlor featured in the RTÉ Television production 'Keys to my life' which was broadcast on 19 September 2021.

References

External links
Morning Ireland profile

Living people
People educated at Manor House School, Raheny
Alumni of Trinity College Dublin
RTÉ newsreaders and journalists
RTÉ Radio 1 presenters
1965 births
People from Rathmines
Irish women radio presenters
Irish women journalists